George Alexander Louis Lebour, MA, DSc, FGS (1847 – 21 February 1918) was an English geologist.

Lebour was educated at the Royal School of Mines and was then a staff member of the Geological Survey from 1873 to 1876. At the Durham College of Science, he was a lecturer in geological surveying from 1876 to 1879 and then succeeded David Page as professor of geology upon the latter's death in 1879. Lebour held this professorial chair until his own death in 1918.

He wrote Handbook to the Geology and Natural History of Northumberland and Durham, which went through three editions from 1879 to 1889. He wrote more than 100 papers on carboniferous geology, thermal conductivity of rocks, and underground temperature. He was awarded the Murchison Medal in 1904.

Upon his death, Lebour was survived by his widow Emily and two daughters; another daughter predeceased him. His youngest daughter was the noted marine biologist Marie Lebour.

References

Selected Bibliography

External links
 

1847 births
1918 deaths
English geologists
Alumni of Imperial College London
Academics of Durham University